Paul Hugh Howard Potts (19 July 1911 – 26 August 1990), a British-born poet who lived in British Columbia in his youth, was the author of Dante Called You Beatrice (1960), a memoir of unrequited love. One of the women treated in the memoir was Jean Hore, who married the writer Philip O'Connor but ended up confined as a schizophrenic for over fifty years until her death.

Potts was born in Datchet, Berkshire to (Arthur George) Howard Potts (1869-1918), who had emigrated to Victoria, British Columbia, Canada, where he was a partner in a bakery and confectionery business, and his Irish wife Julia Helen Kavanagh (also recorded as Cavanagh). Arthur Potts's father, Dr Walter Jeffery Potts (1837-1898), had married Julia, daughter of Sir Thomas Branthwaite Beevor, 3rd Baronet; many descendants with the name 'Beevor-Potts' live in Canada.

He was educated in Canada, England (at Stonyhurst until the age of sixteen) and Italy (at a Jesuit college in Florence), but from the early 1930s he lived in London. He frequented the Soho-Fitzrovia area where he would sell broadsheet copies of his poetry in the streets and pubs.

Among Potts's literary friends were George Orwell and the English poet George Barker. Potts's memoir of Orwell, "Don Quixote on a Bicycle", appeared in The London Magazine in 1957 and became a chapter of Dante Called You Beatrice. His 1948 essay “The World of George Barker” appeared in Poetry Quarterly.

In late middle-age, Potts was '...balding' with 'a stutter that he mixed with rapid blinking and an amused chuckle as he started a sentence', eventually becoming a dissolute figure 'barred from Soho pubs'. Potts died in 1990 of smoke inhalation from a fire in his bedroom; he had been house-bound for some years.

Bibliography
(1940) A Poet's Testament, with drawings by Cliff Bayliss and Scott MacGregor, foreword by Hugh MacDiarmid
(1944) Instead of a Sonnet (enlarged 1978)
(1960) Dante Called You Beatrice
(1970) To Keep A Promise
(1973) Invitation to a Sacrament
(2006) Ronald Caplan (ed.), George Orwell's Friend: Selected Writings by Paul Potts

See also
Children of Albion: Poetry of the Underground in Britain (1969)
Faber Book of Twentieth Century Verse (1953)
New Lyrical Ballads (1945)

Notes and references

Further reading
Latona, Robert, "Happily Never After, or, The Rubbish Tower", New Partisan.
"Guide to the Paul Potts Papers", Northwestern University Library, Evanston, IL

1911 births
1990 deaths
English memoirists
People from Datchet
20th-century English poets
English male poets
20th-century English male writers
English male non-fiction writers